Němčice is a municipality and village in Svitavy District in the Pardubice Region of the Czech Republic. It has about 1,000 inhabitants.

Administrative parts
Villages of Člupek, Pudilka and Zhoř are administrative parts of Němčice.

Geography
It lies in the Svitavy Uplands.

The village of Němčice is a linear village situated along the Zlatý pásek Stream. There are eight watermills in the municipality built along the stream.

History
The first written mention of Němčice is from 1295. The village was probably founded between 1240 and 1260 during the colonization of Litomyšl surroundings. The village of Zhoř was founded after 1227, Člupek in 1695 and Pudilka in 1697.

The municipality of Němčice was created by merger of Němčice, Člupek and Pudilka in 1850. Zhoř was joined in 1976.

From 1 January 2007, Němčice is no longer a part of Ústí nad Orlicí District and belongs to Svitavy District.

Transport
Two second class roads cross the municipality: 
 road 358: the road part from Litomyšl to Česká Třebová, crossing Němčice, Člupek and Zhoř
 road 360: the road part from Litomyšl to Ústí nad Orlicí, crossing Němčice

References

External links

Villages in Svitavy District